Robbins Hill is a hill, 3 nautical miles (6 km) long, which is the East-most rock unit on the north side of the terminus of Blue Glacier, on Scott Coast, Victoria Land. The feature rises to 1140 m in the west portion. Named after Rob Robbins, who in 1999 completed 20 consecutive years of deployment to Antarctica in various positions held for three United States Antarctic Program (USAP) support contractors at McMurdo and Palmer Stations; wintered at McMurdo, 1981 and 1985; construction diver/divemaster, McMurdo and Palmer Stations, 1985–86, 1988–89, 1995-96 seasons; Scientific Diving Coordinator, McMurdo and Palmer Stations, 1996-99 seasons. Mr. Robbins made over 1,000 dives in Antarctica for USAP and supported science in many locations around McMurdo Sound.

External links 

Hills of Victoria Land
Scott Coast